"God Save the South" is a poem-turned-song written by American George Henry Miles, under the pen name Earnest Halphin, in 1861. It is considered by some to have been the unofficial national anthem of the Confederate States of America. The commonly heard version was composed by Charles W. A. Ellerbrock, while C. T. De Cœniél later composed a different tune for the song.

History 
"God Save The South" was written in 1861 by Miles as Ernest Halphim with the music for it being composed by Charles Wolfgang Amadeus Ellerbrock. Halphim wrote it with the intent to inspire Confederate soldiers during the American Civil War with the thought that God would be with them. It was also written as an intent to counter the Union's usage of the newly-written "Battle Hymn of the Republic" as a rallying hymn. It was also used as a way to develop a unique Southern national culture to distinguish the Confederate States from the United States. When it was published in New Orleans, it was the first song published in the Confederate States since the Ordinance of Secession. The hymn was later included in the Confederate hymnal, The Soldier's Companion given to all Confederate soldiers during the war.

"God Save The South" is considered to be the national anthem for the Confederate States and was published in Virginia with the subtitle of "Our national Confederate anthem" with the image of a Confederate soldier carrying the Stainless Banner with "God Save The South" on it. However, "Dixie" was popular among Confederate soldiers and citizens and thus was a marching song and parade song of Confederate troops. However, in 1950 Richard Harwell wrote: "[Dixie] can hardly be said to meet the requirements of a national anthem, [although] it has become a truly national tune, permanently enshrined in the hearts of Americans in both the North and the South. That honor rightly belongs to 'God Save the South' not just by virtue of its status as the new nation's first published song but also because of its stirring poetry and its outstanding musical setting."

Composition 
While the anthem mostly used Ellerbrock's music, it was also set to the tune of the British national anthem, "God Save the King". Because of this association, as well as a perceived lack of originality, “God Save the South” was criticized in Southern Punch, a weekly periodical modeled after Britain’s Punch. C. T. De Cœniél also wrote another tune for "God Save the South" after Ellerbrock's original, which gained popularity at the time.

The fifth verse has been used by one writer as an example of the citizens of the Confederacy's perceived affiliation with George Washington, as he was also considered to be a rebel during the American Revolutionary War.

Lyrics

References

External links
The Civil War Music
Halphin version

Songs of the American Civil War
1861 songs
North American anthems
Culture of the Southern United States
Songs based on poems
Religion and politics